The FIVB World Grand Prix 2006 was the fourteenth edition of the annual women's volleyball tournament, which is the female equivalent of the Men's Volleyball World League.

Qualification

Asia
The top four Asian teams according to the FIVB World Rankings

Europe
European Qualification Tournament in Baku, Azerbaijan from July 26 to July 31, 2005

Group A

|}

|}

Group B

|}

|}

Semi finals

|}

Third-place match

|}

First Place Match

|}

Azerbaijan, Russia and Poland qualified; Italy received a wild card as the host nation.

North and South America
Pan-American Cup in Santo Domingo, Dominican Republic from June 8 to June 19, 2005

Teams

Preliminary rounds

Ranking
The host China and top five teams in the preliminary round advance to the Final round.

|}

First round

Group A
Venue: Ariake Coliseum, Tokyo, Japan

|}

Group B
Venue: Hong Kong Coliseum, Hong Kong

|}

Group C
Venue: Łuczniczka, Bydgoszcz, Poland

|}

Second round

Group D
Venue: Macau Forum, Macau

|}

Group E
Venue: Jamsil Indoor Gymnasium, Seoul, South Korea

|}

Group F
Venue: Taipei Municipal Gymnasium, Taipei, Taiwan

|}

Third round

Group G
Venue: Beilun Gymnasium, Ningbo, China

|}

Group H
Venue: Nimiboot Gymnasium, Bangkok, Thailand

|}

Group I
Venue: Momotaro Arena, Okayama, Japan

|}

Final round
Venue: PalaCalafiore, Reggio Calabria, Italy

Pool play

Group A

|}

|}

Group B

|}

|}

Final four

Semifinals

|}

5th place match

|}

3rd place match

|}

Final

|}

Overall ranking

Individual awards

Most Valuable Player:

Best Scorer:

Best Spiker:

Best Blocker:

Best Server:

Best Libero:

Best Setter:

References
FIVB
 CEV Results

FIVB World Grand Prix
2006 in Italian sport
V
2006